Maryam Nami (born 25 January 1995) is an Iranian footballer who plays as a goalkeeper for Kowsar Women Football League club Heyat Alborz and the Iran women's national team.

References

External links

1995 births
Living people
Iranian women's footballers
Iran women's international footballers
Footballers at the 2010 Summer Youth Olympics
Women's association football goalkeepers
People from Ilam Province
21st-century Iranian women